Rudi Hornig (10 August 1938 – May 2014) was a German boxer. He competed in the men's light heavyweight event at the 1972 Summer Olympics.

References

1938 births
2014 deaths
German male boxers
Olympic boxers of West Germany
Boxers at the 1972 Summer Olympics
Boxers from Berlin
Light-heavyweight boxers